They Go Boom is a 1929 short comedy film directed by James Parrott and starring Laurel and Hardy.

Tagline
3AM - Mr Hardy had the sniffles - His carburetor hadn't been right for days and days -

Plot
Laurel & Hardy try to sleep in a rented room. Hardy, suffering from a cold, coughs frequently, while Laurel snores. Both of them have trouble falling asleep because of this. They try to solve their problems, but this results in total chaos. The owner of the room (played by Charlie Hall) threatens to throw them out. When the duo are back in their room, their air mattress is filled up accidentally with gas and blown up so big that Stan and Ollie are pressed against the ceiling. After they have realized the trouble they are in, they start to panic, at which point Oliver sneezes and the mattress explodes.The hotel owner and police officers enter the room and Oliver sneezes again collapsing the ceiling.

Cast
 Stan Laurel as Stan
 Oliver Hardy as Ollie
Uncredited
 Charlie Hall as Landlord
 Sam Lufkin as Policeman

Production
Typical of early talkies, the film has no musical score but makes effective use of sound effects. There is only music at the beginning and end of the film, the opening titles utilising the song "Runnin' Wild".

References

External links 
 
 
 
 

1929 films
1929 comedy films
American black-and-white films
Films directed by James Parrott
Laurel and Hardy (film series)
Films with screenplays by H. M. Walker
1929 short films
American comedy short films
1920s English-language films
1920s American films